Novoye Selo is a rural locality (a village) in Krasavino Urban Settlement, Velikoustyugsky District, Vologda Oblast, Russia. The population was 45 as of 2002.

Geography 
Novoye Selo is located 29 km northeast of Veliky Ustyug (the district's administrative centre) by road. Novaya Derevnya is the nearest rural locality.

References 

Rural localities in Velikoustyugsky District